"She's a Rainbow" is a song by the Rolling Stones and was featured on their 1967 album Their Satanic Majesties Request.  It has been called "the prettiest and most uncharacteristic song" that Mick Jagger and Keith Richards wrote for the Stones, although somewhat ambiguous in intention.

Composition and recording

The song includes rich lyricism, vibrant piano by Nicky Hopkins and Brian Jones' use of the Mellotron. The second verse includes:

John Paul Jones, later of Led Zeppelin, arranged the strings of this song during his session days. Backing vocals were provided by the entire band except for Charlie Watts. Notably, all of the vocals sound like soft background singing with the music overshadowing them to the point of the lyrics being difficult to hear. The lyrics in the chorus share the phrase "she comes in colours" with the song of that title by Love, released in December 1966.

The song begins with the piano playing an ascending run with a turnaround, which returns throughout the song as a recurring motif. This motif is developed by the celesta and strings in the middle 8. Humorous and ambiguous devices are used, such as when the strings play out-of-tune and off-key towards the end of the song, and when the other Stones sing their "La La's" like little children.
The song is in the key of B flat.   The ascending run starts on C and goes up the Bb scale : C D E F G B A.

Release and appearances 
"She's a Rainbow" was released as a single in November 1967 and went to No. 25 in the United States. Cash Box said that the Rolling Stones "[step] up their blues beat with orchestrations that surround the listener in a swirling collage of offsetting tonal colors."

It has regularly featured on Stones' hits compilations, including Through the Past, Darkly (Big Hits Vol. 2) (1969), More Hot Rocks (Big Hits & Fazed Cookies) (1972), 30 Greatest Hits (1977), Singles Collection: The London Years (1989), Forty Licks (2002), and GRRR! (2012).

Personnel

According to authors Philippe Margotin and Jean-Michel Guesdon:

The Rolling Stones
 Mick Jagger lead vocal, harmony vocal, tambourine
 Keith Richards acoustic guitar, lead guitar
 Brian Jones Mellotron
 Bill Wyman bass
 Charlie Watts drums
 Unidentified musicians (played by the Rolling Stones) backing vocals, percussion

Additional personnel
 Nicky Hopkins piano, harpsichord
 John Paul Jones string arrangement
 Unidentified session musicians string section

Charts

In popular culture 

 The song was used in a 1998 advert for Apple's iMac G3 computer, to showcase the iMac's wide variety of colours. 
 At the end of the 3rd episode ("Forbidden Fruit") of American Horror Story: Apocalypse, music from a radio changes to the song, as witches Cordelia, Myrtle, and Madison emerge from the shadows.
 In Season 2, Episode 5 episode of Ted Lasso, the song plays as Roy Kent (Brett Goldstein) journeys from a television studio to the stadium, joining the coaching staff of AFC Richmond. 
 In the 2021 film Cruella, the song serves as the introduction to Estella (Emma Stone), whose artistic genius, shown onscreen in a colorful burst of outfits, is also reflected in the song lyrics:  "She comes in colours everywhere. She combs her hair. She's like a rainbow."
 In the third season of  Ghostwriter, the character in the song plays a ghost character.

Notes

References

Sources

 

Psychedelic pop songs
British psychedelic rock songs
The Rolling Stones songs
London Records singles
Decca Records singles
1967 singles
Songs written by Jagger–Richards
Music videos directed by Michael Lindsay-Hogg
1967 songs
Baroque pop songs